Larry Glen Linne (born July 20, 1962) is a former American football player and businessman. He was a replacement player for the New England Patriots. In his 3 professional games, he scored two touchdowns. Linne also spent time on the practice squads of the San Diego Chargers and Dallas Cowboys. He has been the CEO for multiple companies.

References

External links
Larry Linne College Stats
Larry Linne | Intellectual Innovations
Larry Linne

1962 births
Living people
New England Patriots players
American football wide receivers
Texas Longhorns football players
UTEP Miners football players
National Football League replacement players